The Petter's chameleon (Furcifer petteri) is a species of chameleon, which is endemic to northern Madagascar. Furcifer petteri was initially described as the subspecies Chamaeleo willsii petteri by Édouard-Raoul Brygoo and Charles Domergue in 1966, but later transferred to the genus Furcifer and given full species status by Frank Glaw and Miguel Vences in 1994.

Etymology
Both the specific name, petteri, and the common name, Petter's chameleon, are in honour of French primatologist Jean-Jacques Petter.

Geographic range
Furcifer petteri is endemic to Madagascar. Its type locality is the eastern edge of the Ankarana Reserve, specifically the Ankarana massif.

Conservation status and habitat

Description
The female specimens are slightly smaller than the males, and have similar colouration. When the females are excited, they change colours quickly, becoming yellow-lemon with two spots of light blue, and one of red.

Taxonomy
Furcifer petteri was initially described as Chamaeleo willsii petteri by Brygoo and Domergue in 1966. It is commonly known as Petter's chameleon. According to the Integrated Taxonomic Information System, Furcifer petteri is the valid name for this species.

References

Further reading
Brygoo E-R, Domergue CA (1966). "Notes sur Chamaeleo willsi Günther, 1890, et description d'une sous-espèce nouvelle C. willsi petteri n. ssp." Bulletin du Muséum d'histoire naturelle, Paris 38 (4): 353-361. (Chamaeleo willsi petteri, new subspecies). (in French).
Glaw F, Vences M (1994). A Fieldguide to the Amphibians and Reptiles of Madagascar, Second Edition. Cologne, Germany: Vences & Glaw Verlag/Serpents Tale. 480 pp. . (Furcifer petteri, new combination).

Furcifer
chameleon
chameleon
Reptiles described in 1966
Taxa named by Édouard-Raoul Brygoo
Taxa named by Charles Domergue